Russian Cup may refer to:

 Cup of Russia in artistic gymnastics
 Russian Cup (bandy)
 Russian Cup (football)
 Russian Cup (rugby league)
 Russian Cup (tennis)

See also
Rostelecom Cup (figure skating; formerly called the Cup of Russia)
Russian Open Championship (ice hockey; formerly included the Cup of Russia League)
Russian Championship (disambiguation)
Russian Basketball Cup
Russian Super Cup (football)
Russian Railways Cup (football)
Russian Premier League Cup (football)